Rayman: The Animated Series (also known as Rayman: The TV Series, or just Rayman) is a series of animated short films created by Ubi Soft in 1999, based on the Rayman video game series, following the success of Rayman 2: The Great Escape. It was meant to be a series of 26 episodes with a projected release during fall of 2000, but only four were completed when it was cancelled mid-series, leaving a fifth episode near to completion. The series was only broadcast in France, Germany and the Netherlands, but was released on VHS in North America, and additionally on DVD in France prior to the TV airing.

Series overview
Lac-Mac is the star of a galactic circus, run by Rigatoni and Admiral Razorbeard. He and his friends are forced to live life as circus freaks, hit by whips and generally mistreated. They only wish that they can be free from their dreadful, unfair lives. One night, after Lac-Mac has just done a great performance, the circus closes for the night and Rigatoni picks up a new circus recruit, Rayman. Rayman is forced to stay at the circus because he can do amazing tricks with his floating limbless hands. He discovers that the other performers are forced to stay in this prison despite not having done anything wrong. Rayman won't take this. That night, he helps them escape. Rigatoni hires the bumbling detective, Inspector Grub, to bring the "fugitives" back. Rayman leads the circus freaks in outsmarting Grub and living in the city of Aerotropolis, the populated world the traveling circus landed on.

Episodes

Characters

Heroes

Rayman 
The protagonist of the show, Rayman, has magical abilities and powers which he uses to help his new friends defeat Grub. He has no neck, legs, or arms. His feet stand on the ground and his hands, torso and head float in the air. He comes up with plans to get away from Grub.

Betina 
A girl. She can perform great acrobatics and can land perfectly. She takes care of Flips like an older sister. She has a similar personality to Rayman and is kind and caring, although she can be sassy as seen in the episode NO PARKING.

Cookie 
A paranoid, anthropomorphic mole. Cookie is whiny and dramatic, and constantly questions Rayman's ideas. He is also a good handyman, fixing the group's car, and making a periscope to keep an eye on Grub, as well as being a great cook. At first it seems like he doesn't care about others' feelings, but this is not so.

Flips 
A young fairy, Flips can't speak, and instead communicates by squeaking, which it seems the others understand, as she does the others. Flips rarely walks, and flies everywhere instead. She is always trying to help. She is always with Betina, sleeping in the same cage as her during their time at the circus, despite being small and easily able to fly away through the bars. Flips refuses to run away and save herself because if she did, she would have to leave Betina behind; she explains that they need each other.

Lac-Mac 
A slightly dumb, linguistically challenged anthropomorphic rabbit that can juggle and bend cast iron steel bars. Lac-Mac is sometimes clueless to the world around him and is dragged into doing things by Cookie, who takes advantage of him. His appearance and personality may be based on Globox, a character in the Rayman video games. Lac-Mac can be described as naïve and even shy, but he means well, even if his trying to help ends in catastrophe. There are subliminal hints across the series that he may have a crush on Betina, but this is only hinted at and never mentioned.

Villains

Rigatoni 
The cruel owner of the flying Circus and responsible for Rayman and his friends' statuses as fugitives. Rigatoni is the main antagonist of the show. He is obsessed with catching Rayman, who is constantly getting his name wrong, calling him "Linguini" or "Ravioli". Despite his Italian name (derived from a pasta of the same name) he has a Brooklyn accent. He is the antagonist of the series.

Admiral Razorbeard 
A robot pirate working for Rigatoni, who first appeared in the video games as the main antagonist of Rayman 2: The Great Escape. He is in charge of making sure that the "freaks" are in their cages and behaving.

Grub 
A policeman and detective hired by Rigatoni to capture Rayman and his friends, His species (including most of the citizens) resembles the Teensies from the Rayman games due to them having the same noses. He lives on his own in a tree house high up in Aeropolis forest, which Rayman and the gang happen to fall into and then have to keep themselves out of Grub's sight. In the third episode, it's revealed that his mother resides in a nut house (because of her uncontrollable yelling) visits her occasionally. In the fourth and final episode, he apparently got himself a date with unnoticeable help from Rayman and his friends, in hoping that he'll be off their backs because of it. It's also worth noting that out of the three villains in the show, he's the only one to appear in more than one episode after the first before the show's cancellation.

Voice cast

Production 
According to producer François Pétavy twenty-six quarter-hour episodes were planned (although some sources incorrectly say thirteen or mean thirteen half-hour episodes), but after the fourth episode was completed, the show was cancelled, despite being funded by the government of Quebec, Canada. The second episode "No Parking" was the pilot episode that debuted at Annecy International Animated Film Festival in 1999. They were aired in very few countries in Europe, notably France, Germany and the Netherlands. The fifth, unfinished episode was to be called "My Fair Lac-Mac", earning much fan speculation about the episode's content. This episode was almost done in production, but was stopped at the last minute.

Home media 
Although very rare, the Rayman animated series is available on VHS and DVD. An English-dubbed VHS was released in North America, while a French one can be found in France and Belgium. A DVD is also available, but only in France. Though the text on the cover is in French, the English and German-dubbed versions are included as well as the original French version. In Germany it was released on VHS as part of a CD-ROM Special Edition of the first game.

See also 
 Rabbids Invasion

References

External links

 Rayman: The Animated Series on RaymanPC.com

Animated series based on video games
Animated Series
1999 British television series debuts
2000 British television series endings
1990s British animated television series
2000s British animated television series
1999 Canadian television series debuts
2000 Canadian television series endings
1990s Canadian animated television series
2000s Canadian animated television series
1999 French television series debuts
2000 French television series endings
1990s French animated television series
2000s French animated television series
British children's animated science fiction television series
Canadian children's animated science fiction television series
French children's animated science fiction television series
British computer-animated television series
Canadian computer-animated television series
French computer-animated television series
Works based on Ubisoft video games